FC Sairme Bagdati is a defunct Georgian football club based in the town of Baghdati. The club played their last four seasons in Regionuli Liga. 

Their home ground was Bagdatis Tsentraluri Stadioni with the capacity of 3,000.

History
Sairme initially starting taking part in second tier of the Georgian Soviet league.

In mid-2010s the club twice in a row came 3rd in Meore Liga, followed by the second place taken in 2016. Sairme under the management of Davit Machitidze finished one point short of a group winner and according to the existing league regulations, dropped down to Regionuli Liga along with all the remaining teams.  

With new coach Jaba Akhaladze in the new league, Sairme ended up in mid-table. Soon financial difficulties worsened their performance later. In 2020, Sairme played the last season before their formal withdrawal.

Seasons

Name
The club was named after Sairme balneological resort, located in 25 km from the town of Bagdati.

References

External links
Page on Facebook

Profile on Soccerway

Defunct football clubs in Georgia (country)